Kongskrona is a  tall mountain peak in the municipality of Sunndal in Møre og Romsdal county, Norway. It is the higher of the two peaks on the main mountain Vinnufjellet. Its neighbouring peak is Dronningkrona, which is about  shorter. The name means King's crown in Norwegian (the neighboring peak Dronningkrona means Queen's crown).

To the north of the mountain lies the Innerdalen valley. The top of the mountain is a glacier called Vinnubreen or Vinnufonna.

References

Mountains of Møre og Romsdal
Sunndal